Rob Paris is an American film producer and former talent agent. He began his entertainment career at CAA as a literary agent, then moving to Ed Snider's production company, and finally establishing his own firm, ParisFilm.

Filmography
 The Maiden Heist (2009)
 Dirty Girl (2010)
 Gambit (2012)
 Everly (2014)
 The Blackcoat's Daughter (2015)
 I Am the Pretty Thing That Lives in the House (2016)
 The Last Laugh (2019)
 Please Baby Please (2022)

References

External links
 

American film producers
Year of birth missing (living people)
Living people